The North Caucasian longbarbel gudgeon (Romanogobio ciscaucasicus) is a species of cyprinid fish found in the Western Caspian basin, from the Kuma drainages in Russia to the Yalaminskie drainages in Azerbaijan.

References

Romanogobio
Fish described in 1932